The X73500 is a diesel multiple unit (DMU) train type operated by SNCF. They were built between 1999 and 2004 by Alsthom DDF.

General Information
The trains are single railcars. The units were ordered jointly with Deutsche Bahn, with their Class 641 units.

The trains have modern features which were new to TER trains, such as:
 Passenger Information Systems (PIS) inside and outside of the train
 Low floor section with wide doors, for those with poor mobility
 Air conditioning
 Stronger cab area for reduced crash damage 

The trains can work in multiple of up to 3 sets.

X73813 - X73818 are former CFL (Luxembourg) units 2101 - 2106 and operate in the Alsace region. SNCF Class X 73900 is an identical version of the X 73500, but can also operate into Germany.

Liveries
 TER livery - metallic grey with blue ends and TER logos. Most X 73500 carry this.
 TER Bourgogne livery - metallic grey with red and yellow ends
 TER Languedoc-Roussillon livery - metallic grey with red, yellow sun rays.
 TER Champagne-Ardennes livery - metallic grey with yellow on the central part and the logo of the region.

Differences within the class
 X 73744 and X 73751 wear a special livery for the Andelot-en-Montagne - La Cluse railway
 X 73752 - X 73755 have been fitted with Integra-Signum (Swiss Train Protection) and are used on the Besançon - Le Locle - La Chaux-de-Fonds service.
 X 73809 with Poitou-Charentes region has been fitted with solar panels to its roof to power the electrical components of the train

Use of X 73500

The units are used on rural, unelectrified railway lines in France and are operated by all TER regions except Île-de-France, Corsica and Provence-Alpes-Côte d'Azur.

They operate the following services:

 Bourges - Nevers
 Chartres - Courtallain — Saint-Pellerin
 Reims - Tergnier
 Saint-Etienne - Le Puy
 Saint-Marcellin - Grenoble - Chambéry (via the Grenoble–Montmélian railway)
 Grenoble - Chambéry - Bellegarde - Genève (stand in for faulty X 72500)
 Grenoble - Veynes - Gap
 Grenoble - Clelles
 Toulouse - Auch
 Toulouse - Figeac - Aurillac
 Aurillac - Brive-la-Gaillarde
 Rodez - Figeac - Brive-la-Gaillarde
 Le Havre - Rolleville
 Nantes - Vertou
 Sarreguemines - Sarre-Union
 Strasbourg - Wissembourg
 Strasbourg - Lauterbourg
 Strasbourg - Saverne
 Colmar - Munster - Metzeral
 Tours - Chinon
 Besançon - La Chaux-de-Fonds
 Dole - Morez - Saint Claude
 Montbéliard - Belfort - Lure - Vesoul
 Beauvais - Le Tréport-Mers
 Clermont-Ferrand - Gannat - Lapeyrouse - Commentary - Montluçon
 Montluçon - Saint-Amand-Montrond - Bourges
 Bressuire - Thouars - Saumur - Tours
 Mulhouse - Thann - Kruth
 Lison - Saint-Lô - Coutances
 Granville - Argentan
 Limoges - Ussel
 Marvejols - La Bastide-Saint-Laurent-les-Bains
 Monsempron-Libos - Penne-d'Agenais - Agen
 Étang-sur-Arroux - Autun - Avallon - Auxerre - Laroche-Migennes
 Corbigny - Clamecy - Auxerre - Laroche-Migennes
 Brest - Châteaulin - Quimper
 Brest - Le Relecq-Kerhuon - Landerneau
 Brest - Landerneau - Morlaix
 Brest - Landerneau - Landivisiau
 Quimper - Lorient
 Roscoff - Morlaix
 Nantes - Sainte-Pazanne - Saint-Gilles-Croix-de-Vie
 Nantes - Sainte Pazanne - Pornic
 Nantes - Vertou
 Saint-Brieuc - Dinan
 Dol de Bretagne - Dinan
 Plouaret - Lannion
 Le Mans - Alençon
 Nevers - Cosne sur Loire
 Lyon - Tassin - Lozanne / Brignais / Sain-Bel
 Lisieux - Pont-l'Eveque - Trouville-Deauville
 Dijon - Moulins
 Alès - Bessèges
 La Rochelle - Rochefort
 Pau - Oloron
 Carcassonne - Limoux - Quillan

This list does not include all services.

Gallery

Depots

 TER Alsace - Strasbourg - 24 Railcars
 TER Aquitaine - Limoges - 15 Railcars
 TER Auvergne - Clermont-Ferrand - 35 Railcars
 TER Basse-Normandie - Caen - 11 Railcars
 TER Bourgogne - Nevers - 10 Railcars
 TER Bretagne - Rennes - 15 Railcars
 TER Centre - Tours - 15 Railcars
 TER Champagne-Ardenne - Epernay - 20 Railcars
 TER Franche-Comté - Dijon - 20 Railcars
 TER Haute-Normandie - Sotteville-les-Rouen - 11 Railcars
 TER Languedoc-Roussillon - Toulouse - 9 Railcars
 TER Limousin - Limoges - 15 Railcars
 TER Lorraine - Metz - 6 Railcars
 TER Midi-Pyrénées - Toulouse - 28 Railcars
 TER Nord-Pas-de-Calais - Lille - 10 Railcars
 TER Pays de la Loire - Nantes - 17 Railcars
 TER Picardie - Longueau - 12 Railcars
 TER Poitou-Charentes - Limoges - 8 Railcars
 TER Rhône-Alpes - Lyon - 50 Railcars

See also
 Alstom Coradia LINT

External links

73500
Alstom Coradia
Diesel multiple units of France

hu:Alstom Coradia A TER